Augsburg is an unincorporated community in Pope County, Arkansas, United States.

In 1883, the first German-speaking Lutheran families began arriving in Pope County, 15 miles northwest of Russellville.

Augsburg was named for the German city of Augsburg. In 1884, they built their first church, Zion Lutheran Church. In 1907, it burned and a new one was built which also burned, in 1978, and replaced in 1979–80. Rev. F. W. Herzberger was the first Pastor and Rev. Joshua Ralston is the current Pastor.

List of Augsburg Zion Church pastors

F.W Herzberger 1883-1885
Henry Koch 1885-1887
C. Burkhart 1888-1895
Gerhardt V. Toerne 1895-1896
August F.Graebener 1897-1905
W.J Kaiser 1905-1906
H.M Schreiner 1906-1917
B.F Noack 1917-1919
H.F Meyer 1919-1920
Alexander Wagner 1921-1923
H.M Hanson 1923-1925
Henry D. Wagner 1925-1929
C.H Neuhas 1929-1930
Albert Behnke 1930-1933
M.L Rothe 1931-1932
M.L Cook 1933-1936
H.M Hanson 1936-1940
Adolph Kollmorgen 1940-1949
Martin Gassner 1949-1951
Julius Dahms 1951-1953
D.D Schiebinger 1953-1955
E. Schroeder 1955-1956
R.C Jahn 1956-1957
John C Kaiser 1957-1960
W.E Griesse 1960-1963
Jack Robinson 1963-1966
William Couch 1966-1967
W.H Ringhardt 1967-1991
Loren E. Famuliner 1992-1999
Herbert Swanson 2003-2005
Thom Lasko 2005-2017
Reed Schoaff 2017-2018
Joshua Ralston 2019–present

Pictures of the church

External links
Google maps image

German-American culture in Arkansas
Unincorporated communities in Arkansas
Unincorporated communities in Pope County, Arkansas
Russellville, Arkansas micropolitan area
Populated places established in 1883